Anne Shibuya Gervan (born in Montes Claros, Minas Gerais) is a Brazilian female curler. She currently plays as skip for the female national Brazilian team based in Vancouver, British Columbia. She is right-handed.

Anne Shibuya and Marcio Cerquinho played at the 2017 World Mixed Doubles Curling Championship.

Teams

Women's

Mixed

Mixed doubles

|-

Private life
Anne Shibuya is married to Matthew Gervan, a Canadian curler and coach. Gervan was the coach of the Brazilian team at the 2018 World Mixed Curling Championship. They reside in Vancouver, British Columbia, Canada.

References

External links
 
 Montes-clarense se destaca no curling e vive expectativa para Olimpíadas 
 
 Video:  

Living people
People from Montes Claros
Sportspeople from Minas Gerais
Brazilian female curlers
Curlers from Vancouver
Brazilian curling champions
Year of birth missing (living people)